Born in '45 is a 1966 East German drama film directed by Jürgen Böttcher. It was screened in the Berlinale Classics section of the 65th Berlin International Film Festival.

Cast
 Monika Hildebrand as Lisa
 Rolf Römer as Alfred
 Paul Eichbaum as Mogul
 Holger Mahlich as Hans
 Gesine Rosenberg as Rita
 Walter Stolp as Kaderleiter
 Werner Kanitz as Napoleon
 Ingo Koster as Heinz
 Anita Okon as Sylvi
 Ruth Kommerell as Mutter
 Richard Ruckheim as Opa

Plot
Alfred ("Al"), an auto mechanic and Lisa ("Li"), a pediatric nurse are a young married couple living in East Berlin during the summer of 1965. Both feel that their relationship is unfulfilling and arrange to get a divorce. While Li dutifully continues her work, Al chaffs under the on-the-job demands of his supervisors. Longing to escape the life-long drudgery his parents endured, he takes a short vacation, briefly rooms with his former motorcycle buddies, and finally moves in with his mother. Al forms a close friendship with the 70-year-old Mogul, a volunteer with the local residential housing commission who is sympathetic to the youngster's personal difficulties. Al's idleness leads to sheer boredom and he returns to his job. Socialist party administrators are troubled by his undisguised disaffection, labeling him a social "skeptic."  The plant's political cadre take steps to correct his behavior on and off the job.

Production

Regarded primarily as a documentary filmmaker, director Böttcher’s Born in ‘45 is the only narrative feature film in his ourve.

Film critic Bernd Reinhardt notes that “Böttcher had always wanted to direct features and regarded his documentary work in German Democratic Republic at the beginning of his career as a visual education.”

Made during the administration of Erich Honecker, Born in ‘45 was suppressed before its release when German Democratic Republic “cultural apparatchiks”, deemed it a misrepresentation of the East German working classes. With the fall of the GDR and the Honecker regime in 1990, the film received its world premiere at the 65th Berlin International Film Festival.

Theme

Böttcher offers a sympathetic portrayal of dissafected working-class youth at odds with the conformity demanded by post-Stalinist era officials in the GDR of the 1960s, “a tale of the yearning for a different life.” Film critic Bernd Reinhardt writes:

Style

Born in ‘45 owes its stylistic elements to post-war Italian neorealism, “...heavily influenced by 1950s Italian neo-realists…”, and conveying a  “tender affection for adolescents, a feeling for the fragility of their emotions, such as one sometimes finds in the films of Vittorio De Sica [and] Luchino Visconti...”

Footnotes

Sources 
Berlinale. 2015. Jahrgang 45 (Born in’45). http://www.berlinale.de/en/archive/jahresarchive/2015/02_programm_2015/02_filmdatenblatt_2015_201520175.html#tab=video25
Reinhardt, Bernd. 2011. Some cinematic landmarks of the 1960s in Stalinist East Germany. World Socialist Web Site. https://www.wsws.org/en/articles/2011/08/cine-a03.html

External links
 

1966 films
1966 drama films
German drama films
1960s German-language films
1960s German films